Nationality words link to articles with information on the nation's poetry or literature (for instance, Irish or France).

Events

Works published

Births
Death years link to the corresponding "[year] in poetry" article. There are conflicting or unreliable sources for the birth years of many people born in this period; where sources conflict, the poet is listed again and the conflict is noted:

833:
 Luo Yin (died 909), Chinese poet

834:
 Pi Rixiu (died 883), Tang Dynasty poet and magistrate

836:
 Wei Zhuang (died 910), Chinese poet and Tang period historical figure, is best known for his poetry in shi and ci styles

837:
Ibn Duraid (died 934), Arab poet and philologist

Deaths
Birth years link to the corresponding "[year] in poetry" article:

831:
 Yuan Zhen (born 779), Chinese writer and poet in the middle Tang Dynasty known for his work Yingying's Biography

835:
 Kūkai (born 774), Japanese kanshi poet
 Lu Tong (born 790), Chinese poet

See also

 Poetry
 9th century in poetry
 9th century in literature
 List of years in poetry

Other events:
 Other events of the 12th century
 Other events of the 13th century

9th century:
 9th century in poetry
 9th century in literature

Notes

Poetry by year
Poetry